Lambo is an album by Greek singer Anna Vissi, released in Greece and Cyprus in 1992. The single "Lambo" prompted the mambo dance trend in Greece. Due to its December 24 release date, the album was played extensively during the 1992 Christmas holiday period.

Album Information
Music, lyrics and album production are entirely by Nikos Karvelas.

Lambo, Akoma Mia, Se Hriazome and  O,ti thes ego were released on promotional videos during 1992 and 1993, airing in local TV stations. In 2001, the former two were selected for digital release on Vissi's The Video Collection.

In 2019, the album was selected for inclusion in the Panik Gold box set The Legendary Recordings 1982-2019. The release came after Panik's acquisition rights of Vissi's back catalogue from her previous record company Sony Music Greece. This box set was printed on a limited edition of 500 copies containing CD releases of all of her albums from 1982 to 2019 plus unreleased material.

Track listing 
 "Lambo" (I'm radiant)
 "Akoma Mia" (Once more)
 "O,ti Thes Ego" (Whatever you want, it's me)
 "Ise Oti Pio Agapimeno Eho" (You are what I love most)
 "Pikre Mou" (My bitterness)
 "Se Hriazome" (I need you)
 "Mi" (Don't)
 "Ksanagirna" (Come back)
 "Opou Kai Na Pas" (Wherever you go)
 "Ftene" (It's their fault)
 "Den Thelo Na Kseris" (CD hidden track) (I don't want you to know)

Singles
"Lambo"
"Akoma Mia"
"Se Hriazome"
"O,ti Thes Ego"

Credits and personnel

Personnel
Nikos Karvelas - music, lyrics 
Tony Kontaxakis - electric guitar
Philippos Tsemberoulis - saxophone, clarinet
Anna Vissi - vocals
vocals on track 1 by Nikos Karvelas, Tony Kontaxakis, Manolis Vlachos, Dimitris Yiarmenitis, Spyros Sofronis and Yiannis Doxas

Production
Nikos Karvelas - production management, arrangements, instrumentation, instrument playing
Manolis Vlachos - computer programming, recording engineering, sound remixing at Home Studio

Design
Panagiotis Hadjistefanou - styling
Nikos Mbitzanis - make up
Venia Giannopoulou - hair styling
Takis Diamantopoulos - photos
Anna Vissi - hand lettering
Yiannis Doxas - cover design
Michalis Orfanos - cover printing

Credits adapted from the album's liner notes.

References

Anna Vissi albums
1992 albums
Greek-language albums
Albums produced by Nikos Karvelas
Sony Music Greece albums